Fat Shaker ( - Larzanandeye charbi) is an Iranian drama film written and directed by Mohammad Shirvani. It had its première at the Sundance Film Festival in 2013, and also won the Tiger Award at the Rotterdam Film Festival.

References

External links 
 cine-vue - EIFF 2013: 'Fat Shaker' review

2013 films
2010s Persian-language films
Iranian drama films